The Workshop on Structure and Constituency in Languages of the Americas (WSCLA) is an annual linguistics conference, which started in 1995. The central objective of WSCLA  is to bring together linguists who are engaged in research on the formal study of the indigenous languages of the Americas in order to exchange ideas across theories, language families, generations of scholars, and across the academic and non-academic communities who are involved in language maintenance and revitalization.

Papers and posters presented at WSCLA meetings are published by the University of British Columbia Working Papers in Linguistics (UBCWPL).

External links
WSCLA 15
WSCLA 17
WSCLA 20
WSCLA 22
WSCLA 21
WSCLA 22
WSCLA 23
WSCLA 24
WSCLA 25

Recurring events established in 1995
International conferences in Canada
Linguistics conferences